Route 370, also known as the Buchans Highway, is a  east-west highway in the central portion of Newfoundland in the Canadian province of Newfoundland and Labrador. Its eastern terminus is the intersection at the Trans-Canada Highway (Route 1) in the Town of Badger, and the route ends at the Town of Buchans.

The intersection at the Trans-Canada Highway is very unusual in nature, with a median at the access, and motorists would face a stop signs at the Trans-Canada Highway intersection soon after a stop sign upon returning from their journey on Route 370.

Route description

Route 370 begins at a Y-Intersection between Main Street and Lakeview Avenue in downtown Buchans and heads east to leave town and pass along the northern shores of Red Indian Lake for several kilometres, where it crosses the Buchans River and passes by Mary March Wilderness Park, before passing through Buchans Junction, where it crosses the Mary March River and has an intersection with a local road leading to Millertown. The highway now winds its way through hilly rural terrain for several kilometres as it now follows the Exploits River, where it has an intersection with Route 371 (Millertown Junction Road). Some may believe that Route 371 is abandoned, even it is just unsigned and entirely gravel. Route 370 now enters Badger and crosses over a brook before passing through downtown and coming to an end at Route 1. As with most highways in Newfoundland and Labrador, Route 370 is entirely a two-lane highway.

History

For a period of time late in the 20th century, Route 370 was expected to connect with Route 480, the Burgeo highway. The road was under construction by 1980; but unfortunately, for reasons beyond the Government of Newfoundland and Labrador's control, further construction was abandoned.

Major intersections

References

370